Marc Rocco (June 19, 1962 – May 1, 2009) was an American film director, film producer and screenwriter.

Rocco was born Marc Daniel King in North Hollywood, Los Angeles, to Harvey King and Sandra Elaine Garrett (1942–2002). Garrett married actor Alex Rocco in 1964, who adopted Marc. He directed several films, including Dream a Little Dream, Where the Day Takes You and Murder in the First.

Death
On May 1, 2009, Rocco died in his sleep at his home in North Hills, Los Angeles, California, aged 46, widowing his wife Lisa.

Filmography
Scenes from the Goldmine (1987)
Dream a Little Dream (1989)
Where the Day Takes You (1992)
Teresa's Tattoo (1994) (producer only)
Murder in the First (1995)
The Jacket (2005) (producer only)
Take (2008) (producer only)

References

External links

1962 births
2009 deaths
American adoptees
American film directors
American film producers
American male screenwriters
Place of birth missing
People from North Hollywood, Los Angeles
People from North Hills, Los Angeles
20th-century American male writers
20th-century American screenwriters